The Scout and Guide movement in Sri Lanka is served by the Sri Lanka Scout Association and the Sri Lanka Girl Guides Association.

Sri Lanka Scout Association

The Sri Lanka Scout Association (Sinhala: ශ්‍රී ලංකා බාලදක්ෂ සංගමය), the national Scouting organization of Sri Lanka, was founded in 1912, and became a member of the World Organization of the Scout Movement in 1953. The coeducational Sri Lanka Scout Association has 36,297 members as of 2011.

Sri Lanka Girl Guides Association

The Sri Lanka Girl Guides Association (SLGGA, Lanka Baladhakshika Samajaya) (In Sinhala: ශ්‍රී ලංකා බාළදක්ෂිකා සංගමය, in Tamil:இலங்கைப் மகளீர் சாரணர்க் கழகம்) is the national Guiding organization of Sri Lanka. It serves 37,057 members (as at 01/01/2007) (23,133 in 2003 and 16,656 in 1999). Founded in 1917, the girls-only organization became a full member of the World Association of Girl Guides and Girl Scouts in 1951.

See also
Lake View Park International Scout Centre

References